Rantoul National Aviation Center , also known as Frank Elliott Field, is a public use airport located in Rantoul, a village in Champaign County, Illinois, United States. It is owned by the Village of Rantoul.

Although most U.S. airports use the same three letter location identifier for the FAA and IATA, Rantoul National Aviation Center is assigned TIP by the FAA but has no designation from the IATA (which assigned TIP to Tripoli International Airport in Tripoli, Libya).

In 2021, the airport was selected for the Illinois Department of Transportation's Transportation Improvement Program. The airport received $100,000 to convert existing fuel facility dispensers to self-service dispensers.

History 
The airport was established in 1993 after the closure of Chanute Air Force Base (which was established as Chanute Field in 1917).

Facilities and aircraft 
For the 12-month period ending March 31, 2020, the airport had 20,000 aircraft operations, an average of 55 per day: all general aviation. For the same time period, there were 14 aircraft based at this airport: 10 single-engine and 2 multi-engine airplanes, and 2 helicopters.

The Village of Rantoul operates an FBO on the airport offering fueling, aircraft parking, crew cars, and computer stations.

Accidents and incidents
On August 2, 2002, a Bell 412 helicopter's rotor struck a photographer on the ground while the helicopter was lifting off for a skydiving flight. The probable cause was identified as a congested takeoff and landing area and a low-altitude maneuver performed by the pilot.
On July 24, 2011, a Piper PA 46-350P Malibu impacted terrain and power lines while taking off from Rantoul. The pilot and two passengers sustained fatal injuries. The preflight was reported as hurried due to the private pilot's concern over an approaching storm. After departure, strong winds were reported to push the plane's tail up and nose down, forcing the aircraft into the ground. The engine was reportedly producing thrust until the crash. The probable cause of the aircraft was the pilot's inability to maintain aircraft control during takeoff with approaching thunderstorms; contributing to the accident was the pilot's decision to depart into adverse weather conditions.

References

External links
 Rantoul National Aviation Center at Village of Rantoul website
 

Airports in Illinois
Buildings and structures in Champaign County, Illinois